Krasnopartizansky District is an administrative and municipal district (raion), one of the thirty-eight in Saratov Oblast, Russia. It is located in the east of the oblast. Its administrative center is the urban locality (a work settlement) of Gorny. Population: 13,008 (2010 Census);  The population of Gorny accounts for 39.1% of the district's total population.

References

Notes

Sources

Districts of Saratov Oblast